Lysippos was a Greek sculptor of the 4th century BC. Together with Scopas and Praxiteles, he is considered one of the three greatest sculptors of the Classical Greek era, bringing transition into the Hellenistic period. Problems confront the study of Lysippos because of the difficulty of identifying his style among the copies which survive. Not only did he have a large workshop and many disciples in his immediate circle, but there is understood to have been a market for replicas of his work, supplied from outside his circle, both in his lifetime and later in the Hellenistic and Roman periods.  The Victorious Youth or Getty bronze, which resurfaced around 1972, has been associated with him.

Biography

Born at Sicyon around 390 BC, Lysippos was a worker in bronze in his youth. He taught himself the art of sculpture, later becoming head of the school of Argos and Sicyon. According to Pliny, he produced more than 1,500 works, all of them in bronze. Commentators noted his grace and elegance, and the symmetria, or coherent balance, of his figures, which were leaner than the ideal represented by Polykleitos and with proportionately smaller heads, giving them the impression of greater height. He was famous for his attention to the details of eyelids and toenails.

His pupil, Chares of Lindos, constructed the Colossus of Rhodes, one of the Seven Wonders of the Ancient World. As this statue does not exist today, debate continues as to whether its sections were cast in bronze or hammered of sheet bronze.

Career and legacy 
Lysippos was successor in contemporary repute to the famous sculptor Polykleitos. Among the works attributed to him are the so-called Horses of Saint Mark, Eros Stringing the Bow (of which various copies exist, the best in the British Museum), Agias (known through the marble copy found and preserved in Delphi), the similar Oil Pourer (Dresden and Munich), the Farnese Hercules (which was originally placed in the Baths of Caracalla, although the surviving marble copy lies in the Naples National Archaeological Museum) and Apoxyomenos (or The Scraper, known from a Roman marble copy in the Vatican Museums). Lysippos was also famous for his bronze colossal sculptures of Zeus, 17 metres tall, and Herakles, seven meters seated, both from the city of Taras. The only remaining version of one such statue is a Roman copy of The Weary Herakles (Farnese Hercules), by Glykon,  with heavy musculature typical of early third century Rome.

Canon of Lysippos

Lysippos developed a more gracile style than his predecessor Polykleitos and this has become known as the Canon of Lysippos. In his , Pliny the elder wrote that Lysippos introduced a new canon into art:  signifying "a canon of bodily proportions essentially different from that of Polykleitos". Lysippos is credited with having established the 'eight heads high' canon of body proportions.

Lysippos and Alexander 

During his lifetime, Lysippos was personal sculptor to Alexander the Great; indeed, he was the only artist whom the conqueror saw fit to represent him. An epigram by Posidippus, previously only known from the Anthology of Planudes (APl 119), but also found on the recently discovered Milan Papyrus (65 Austin-Bastianini), takes as its inspiration a bronze portrait of Alexander:

And similarly, an epigram by Asclepiades (APl 120):

Lysippos has been credited with the stock representation of an inspired, godlike Alexander with tousled hair and lips parted, looking upward in what came to be known as the 'Lysippean gaze'. One fine example, an early Imperial Roman copy found at Tivoli, is conserved at the Louvre.

The Victorious Youth (Getty Bronze) 

In 1972, the Victorious Youth, Getty Bronze, or Atleta di Fano to Italians, was discovered and at the urging of Paul Getty, bought by the Getty Museum. The bronze was pulled out of the sea and restored. Because of the amount of corrosion and the thick layer of incrustation that coated the statue when it was found, it can be assumed that it was beneath the water for centuries. This is less than surprising, as most of the classical bronze statues archeologists have found have been fished out of the Mediterranean Sea. It was not uncommon for a shipwreck to occur with something as precious as a sculpture on board. Without any way to find or retrieve them, these pieces were left to sit at the bottom of the ocean for centuries. The damaging corrosion can be removed by cleaning the surfaces mechanically with a scalpel.

The Getty Bronze is believed by some to be Lysippos's work, or at least a copy, because the detail on it is consistent with his style of work and his canon of proportions. Lysippos's work is described by ancient sources as naturalistic with slender and often lengthened proportions, often with exaggerated facial features. Those depicted in the works of Lysippos had smaller heads than those of his mentor Polykleitos because he used a one to eight scale for the head and the total height of the body.

See also 
 Lysistratus, another Greek sculptor

Notes

References 
 A. F. Stewart, "Lysippan Studies" 2. Agias and Oilpourer" American Journal of Archaeology 82.3 (Summer 1978), pp. 301–313.

Further reading 

 Gardner, P. 1905. ‘The Apoxymenos of Lysippos’, JHS 25:234-59.
 Serwint, N. 1996. ‘Lysippos’, in The Dictionary of Art vol. 19: 852–54.
 Stewart, A.F. 1983. ‘Lysippos and Hellenistic sculpture’, AJA 87:262.
 Vermeule, C.C. 1975. ‘The weary Herakles of Lysippos’, AJA 79:323–32.

External links 
 Lysippos biography - an Essay

4th-century BC Greek sculptors
Ancient Greek sculptors
Sculptors of Alexander the Great
Ancient Sicyonians